Glengad is a Gaeltacht village in the parish of Kilcommon in northwest County Mayo, Ireland. It is also known as Dooncarton, a name which comes from an Iron Age tribal chieftain called Ciortan, a character who appears in the Ulster Cycle legend of the Táin Bó Flidhais.

The village which is largely linear and without a main street, lies to the northwest and northeast of Dooncarton Hill in the parish of Kilcommon in Erris. The different areas of Glengad are known under different names. Glengad East is known as Baile Grainne. Middle Glengad was known as Spleckstown and Baile Lecan. West Glengad or Old Glengad was and still is known as Sean Bhaile. Every house in the village looks over Shruth Fhada Con meaning Long hound bay but which is commonly called Sruwaddacon Bay or Broadhaven Bay below.

It has a proliferation of prehistoric archaeology including several megalithic tombs of differing types including wedge, court and portal dolmens, and a well preserved stone circle in Baile Lecan.  

Much of Glengad is a Special Area of Conservation and Sruwaddacon Bay is both an S.A.C. and a S.P.A (Birds Directive) - Special Protected Area for Birds. It is also an E.U. protected N.H.A. (Natural Heritage Area) In May and June the air is filled with the songs of the sky larks hovering so high in the sky that they are almost invisible. Goldcrests abound in winter. Unfortunately for the local sand martins whose nest holes were in the cliffs at Glengad Beach, Royal Dutch Shell sent in their diggers and removed the cliffs, placing nets to stop the birds returning. The 'new' temporary cliffs they rebuilt mechanically don't seem to hold the same appeal for the species. Caubeen Mountain (Dooncarton) sweeps down to Broadhaven Bay and Sruwaddacon Estuary and has some of the most spectacular and scenic views to be found in the county if not the entire country.

Glengad is the proposed landfall site for the contentious pipeline from the Corrib gas field, and is the ongoing scene of protests against the project.

History 

The name means "Glen of the Gads". Gads are willow branches used in basket weaving. When people of Northern Irish/Donegal origin, namely the Coyles, were displaced by the policies of Oliver Cromwell (to hell or to Connaught)in the mid 17th century, they brought with them their craft of making ropes, baskets and creels and they planted willows (from which they obtained their 'gads' or 'sally rods') in this townland where some still remain to this day despite the best efforts of the major landslide in September 2003, to destroy the last vestiges of the willows in the village. The custom of giving the settled area the name of the home territory was widespread. The native Irish people who were sent to 'hell' under Cromwell's policy of 'to hell or to Connacht' were mostly captured and sent as indentured servants to places like Barbados (giving the verb Barbadosed), St. Kitts, and Montserrat in the West Indies to work on British sugar cane plantations, or Virginia and Bermuda (see Irish diaspora).

Prior to the arrival of these displaced people the townland had been known as Dooncarton, a name which it took from the promontory fort known as Dún Chiortáin. Dún Chiortáin was a well-fortified cliff fort probably dating back to the Bronze Age. It is mentioned in the Composition Book of Connaught in 1585. It was then owned by William Burke who was 'attained of treason' in 1592.
In 1610 the property was in the ownership of Michael Cormuck. According to Thomas Johnson Westropp in 1912 he was still in possession of it in 1641 and in 1655.

Westropp described Donncarton as being a well-fortified cliff fort about 170 in length by 100 feet wide. It contained several buildings of various sizes, built of stone and mortar. The walls of some of the buildings were at least six feet wide. All are now reduced to a few feet in height by the road and fence makers. The main house was forty seven feet by thirty six feet with six feet thick walls. The other houses had three feet thick walls. The fort stood on a grassy cliff between two creeks. It had a lovely view of the shores of Dun Chaochain and the mouth of Broadhaven to Erris Head.

According to the ancient legend, a hero named Fergus came on a plundering raid to Erris which was then owned by the giant Donnell who lived at Glencastle. Fergus came to Donnell's castle at Glencastle where he charmed Donnell's faithless wife, Munchin who gave him Donnell's favourite sword. When Donnell found out that he had been betrayed he went to his neighbour Ciortan (of Dún Chiortáin) for aid but he found Ciortan was out in his boat. He shouted to him to come and help him but Ciortain refused to come to his aid. Donnell hurled rocks at Ciortan's boat in anger and managed to sink it. Ciortan was drowned and he is buried at a Broadhaven Bay harbour known locally as Tra Kirtaan Bay (called after Ciortan) close to Barnatra.

Glengad has always been exposed to the elements of wind and ocean. There is an oft told incident that happened before the area was fenced, when the land was farmed in Rundale. During the harvest one year there was a violent storm. The next morning all the stooks of oats were found all together at the far end of the parish, piled one on top of another. The people had great difficulty trying to sort out what belonged to each of them.

During the early 19th century the Irish Tithe Composition Act permitted Protestant clergy to determine fixed payments in order to provide support for them and their families. there was great opposition from the mainly Catholic community to paying tithes. Young men formed organisation such as the Steelboys and Whiteboys who persuaded people not to pay tithes. They visited people's homes at night and had them swear under oath to that effect. They gathered in the surrounding hills at night and sounded horns in defiance. A particular O'Donnell man stood up to them saying that he intended to make his tenants pay their tithes and in 1837 five men broke into his house and threatened that if he attempted to pay any tithes his home and ditches would be levelled. The people gathered on the hills surrounding his house each night sounding horns.

Major landslide area 
A major landslide consisting of 40 separate landslides hit the Glengad area on 19 September 2003. This is not a unique occurrence in Kilcommon parish.  The last recorded landslides took place in 1937.

The inspector from the Environmental Protection Agency who inspected the area after the incident wrote:-

"From a visual inspection the damage is enormous, both on a personal, community and environmental level. The region has best been described as a ‘disaster area’ with serious consequences for the future. Millions of euros of damage were caused, and issues relating to housing, lands and environment will need to be addressed.

Radio and television footage of the region does not appear to have done justice to the widespread damage caused and the effect it has on individuals and on the community.Immense volumes of peat, soil and stone were washed from the mountain into Sruwaddacon Bay and to a lesser extent into Carrowmore Lake. It is impossible to estimate the total amount, but would probably extend to many thousands of tons of earth.

Owing to the nature of damage caused, much more mountainside is exposed and therefore the bay is susceptible to receive more deposits as time progresses."

The Geological Survey of Ireland produced a report on reasons for the major landslide.

In June 2010 Royal Dutch Shell announced it has sought planning permission from An Bord Pleanala to bore a 4 metre wide tunnel over four and a half kilometres in length from Broadhaven Bay at Glengad to their natural gas refinery at Bellanaboy under the Sruwaddacon Bay estuary. This is their third attempt to get their controversial gas pipeline through the Kilcommon community over the last ten years.

Radar station 
In 1999 a radar station was erected on Caubeen Mountain in Dooncarton.

See also
 Kilcommon
 Erris

References

Sources 
 Nolan, R. Within the Mullet (1997) Longford
 Noone, Fr. Sean, Where the Sun Sets (1997) Pollathomas
 Stonepages
 Westropp, T. J. Promontory Forts of Erris (1912) Dublin

Erris
Gaeltacht towns and villages
Gaeltacht places in County Mayo
Towns and villages in County Mayo